Ruska Wieś may refer to the following places:
Ruska Wieś, Lublin Voivodeship (east Poland)
Ruska Wieś, Subcarpathian Voivodeship (south-east Poland)
Ruska Wieś, Ełk County in Warmian-Masurian Voivodeship (north Poland)
Ruska Wieś, Mrągowo County in Warmian-Masurian Voivodeship (north Poland)
Ruska Wieś, Węgorzewo County in Warmian-Masurian Voivodeship (north Poland)